Andrea Molesini (born 28 December 1954) is an Italian novelist.

Born in Venice, Molesini started his career as a translator and an author of stories for children and fables.

Also active as a poet and an essayist, his debut novel Not All Bastards Are from Vienna, earned him the Campiello Prize in 2010. He teaches comparative literature at the University of Padua.

References

1954 births
Writers from Venice
20th-century Italian male writers
20th-century Italian novelists
21st-century Italian novelists
Italian essayists
Italian poets
Academic staff of the University of Padua
Premio Campiello winners
Living people
20th-century Italian translators
Italian male poets
Italian male novelists
Male essayists
20th-century essayists
21st-century essayists
21st-century Italian male writers
Italian male non-fiction writers